Henry Bates Fitz (10 October 1817 - 29 December 1880) was a Member of the Queensland Legislative Council.

Early life
Fitz was born in Windsor to Robert Fitz and his wife Ann (née Cannon). For 20 years from 1843 he was the manager of Pikedale Station on the Darling Downs. In 1859 he purchased Pike's Creek Station.

Politics
Fitz was appointed to the Queensland Legislative Council on 23 May 1860 and served for sixteen years until his resignation on 13 July 1876. He was a spokesman for the ultra squatting faction and detested fellow squatters who were prepared to make concessions.

Personal life
Fitz married Elizabeth Hurst (née Abbott) in 1853 and together had 2 children. He was known to his employees as "Murdering Fitz" due to allegations he had murdered a Chinese shepherd during a labour strike. Fitz died in 1880 and was buried in the Toowong Cemetery.

References

Members of the Queensland Legislative Council
1817 births
1880 deaths
Burials at Toowong Cemetery
19th-century Australian politicians
Pre-Separation Queensland